Alexei Ivanovich Abrikosov (February 20 [March 3], 1824 —  January 31 [February 13], 1904) was a Russian entrepreneur, manufacturer, who founded in the second half of the XIX century  Factory and Trade Association   Abrikosov's son (now the concern Babayevsky), as well as the owner of confectionery and tea shops in Moscow, Supplier of His Imperial Majesty's Court, Chairman of the Board of Accounts Bank, an active state adviser.

According to one version, the first creator of Kinder Surprise.

References

External links 
 Дореволюционные «Киндер Сюрпризы»: как развивал свою кондитерскую империю Алексей Абрикосов

1824 births
19th-century businesspeople from the Russian Empire
1904 deaths
Russian merchants
Recipients of the Order of St. Anna, 2nd class
Recipients of the Order of Saint Stanislaus (Russian), 2nd class
Purveyors to the Russian imperial family
Humanitarians from the Russian Empire
Pastry chefs
Businesspeople from Moscow